The 2019 World Surf League was the competition series hosted by the World Surf League, the global championship body for competitive surfing. The 2019 World Surf League consisted of the Championship Tour (shortboard tour), the Qualifying Series (shortboard and longboard), Big Wave Tour, Longboard Tour, Junior Tour, and other specialty tours and events such as the Vans Triple Crown.

The Annual World Surf League Champion Tour is a professional shortboarding surf tour run by the World Surf League (WSL), formerly known as the Association of Surfing Professionals (ASP) prior to 2014.

The Championship tour is divided by gender into the Men’s and Women’s championship series. The 2019 tour consisted of 11 Men’s events and 10 Women’s events. The placings from each event for each competitor are used to determine, at the conclusion of the tour, the overall female and male champions for 2019, referred to by the league as World Champions.

The 2019 tour began in April and ended in December, travelling to the global locations of Australia, Indonesia, Brazil, South Africa, America, France, Portugal, Hawaii and Tahiti. In 2019 the female world champion was Carissa Moore, from Hawaii, and the male world champion was Italo Ferreira, from Brazil.

2019 Men's Championship Tour

Quicksilver Pro 
The Quicksilver Pro 2019 was held in the Gold Coast, Queensland at Coolangatta. The male competition was won by Brazilian surfer Italo Ferreria (Brazil), who beat competitor Kolohe Andino (USA) by 0.14ths.

Rip Curl Pro 
The Rip Curl Pro was held at Bells Beach in Victoria, Australia from the 17–27 April. It was won by John John Florence (Hawaii), defeating Filipe Toledo (Brazil).

Corona Bali Protected 
The Corona Bali Protected was the third stop of the men's championship tour in 2019, taking place between the 13–25 May in Bali, Indonesia. Kanoa Igarashi (Japan) won this event, defeating Jeremy Flores (France) in the final.

Margaret River Pro 
The Margaret River Pro took place in Western Australia from the 29 May to 4 June. John John Florence (Hawaii) defeated Kolohe Andino (USA) to win the event.

Rio Pro 
The Oi Rio Pro took place in Saquarema, Rio De Janeiro from the 20–23 June 2019. Filipe Toledo (Brazil) defeated Jordy Smith (South Africa) to win the event with a score in the final of 18.04.

J-Bay Open 
The Corona Open J-Bay took place at Jeffery's Bay, South Africa, from the 9 to the 19th July. Gabriel Medina (Brazil) defeated Italo Ferreia (Brazil) for the event win.

Tahiti Pro 
The Tahiti Pro Teahupo'o took place at Teahupo'o in Tahiti, French Polynesia from the 24–29 August. Owen Wright (Australia) defeated Gabriel Medina (Brazil) in the final, with a total score of 17.07.

Freshwater Pro 
The Freshwater Pro was held from the 19–24 September at the Surf Ranch, in Lemoore, California. Gabriel Medina (Brazil) won the event with a total score of 18.86, defeating Filipe Toledo (Brazil).

Quicksilver Pro France 
The Quicksilver Pro France took place from the 3 to 11 October at Capbreton, Hossegor and Seignosse, Landes, France. Jeremy Flores (France) won the event, defeating Italo Ferreria in the final.

RipCurl Pro Portugal 
The MEO RipCurl Pro Portugal took place from the 16–28 October at Supertubos, Peniche. Italo Ferreria (Brazil) defeated Jordy Smith (South Africa) in the final.

Pipe Masters 
The Billabong Pipe Masters is the final event of the men's championship tour, taking place from the 9–19 December in 2019. Italo Ferreria (Brazil) defeated Gabriel Medina (Brazil) in the final, while also securing the 2019 World Title.

Event Results

2019 Men's Championship Tour Jeep Leaderboard 

Points are awarded using the following structure:

Point values are shown using European thousands separators; most English-speaking countries would write these numbers as 10,000 for first place, 7,800 for 2nd place, and so on.

 Championship Tour surfers best 9 of 11 results are combined to equal their final point total.
 Tournament results discarded
Legend

Source

2019 Women's Championship Tour

Boost Mobile Pro Gold Coast 
The Boost Mobile Pro Gold Coast was the first event in the women's championship tour in 2019. It was held on the Gold Coast, and Caroline Marks (USA) defeated Carissa Moore (Hawaii) for the event win.

Rip Curl Pro Bells Beach 
The Rip Curl Pro Bells Beach was held from April 17–27, at Bells Beach in Victoria, Australia. Courtney Conologue (USA) won the event, defeating Malia Manuel (Hawaii) in the final.

Corona Bali Protected 
The Corona Bali Protected was held in Bali, Indonesia from the 13–25 May. Stephanie Gilmore (Australia) won the event, defeating Sally Fitzgibbons (Australia) with a score of 16.83.

Margaret River Pro 
The 2019 Margaret River Pro was held at Margaret River Main Break, in Western Australia, from the 29 May- 9 June. Lakey Peterson (Australia) won the event, defeating Tatiana Weston Webb (Brazil) in the final.

Oi Rio Pro 
The Oi Rio Pro took place in Saquarema, Rio De Janeiro from the 20–28 June 2019. Sally Fitzgibbons (Australia) won this event, defeating Carissa Moore (Hawaii) in the final.

Corona Open J-Bay 
The Corona Open J-Bay was held from the 9–22 July at Jefferys Bay, South Africa. Carissa Moore (Hawaii) defeated Lakey Peterson (USA) in the final to win the event.

Freshwater Pro 
The Freshwater Pro was held from the 19–21 September at the Surf Ranch, in Lemoore, California. Lakey Peterson (USA) was the winner of this event.

Roxy Pro France 
The Roxy Pro France was held from the 3–13 October at Capbreton, Hossegor, Seignosse, and Landes in France. Carissa Moore (Hawaii) defeated Caroline Marks (USA) to win the event.

MEO RipCurl Pro Portugal 
The MEO RipCurl Pro Portugal was held from the 16–28 October in Peniche, Portugal. Caroline Marks (USA) defeated Lakey Peterson (USA) to win the event.

lululemon Maui Pro 
The Maui Pro was the penultimate event of the women's championship tour in 2019. It was held from the 25 November to the 6 December in Honolulu Bay, in Maui, Hawaii. Stephanie Gilmore (Australia) defeated Tyler Wright (Australia) to win the event.

2019 Women's Championship Tour Jeep Leaderboard 

Points are awarded using the following structure:

Point values are shown using European thousands separators; most English-speaking countries would write these numbers as 10,000 for first place, 7,800 for 2nd place, and so on.

 Championship Tour surfers best 8 of 10 results are combined to equal their final point total.
 Tournament results discarded

Legend

Source

Qualifying series

2019 Men's Qualifying Series 

Legend

Source

2019 Women's Qualifying Series 

Legend

Source

Olympic qualification  
For the first time in Olympic history surfing will be included in the Tokyo 2020 Olympics. The WSL 2019 Tour, in conjunction with other events, will be used for Olympic qualification for the 2020 Olympics.

In an agreement reached by the International Surfing Association and the WSL, it was decided that of the 40 places in the Olympic games, 20 would be determined from the ISA World Surfing games, 18 from the WSL (10 men 8 women) and the remaining 2 for the host nation.

2020 Tokyo Olympics 
The following surfers qualified for the 2020 Tokyo Olympics through the WSL;

Changes to 2019 season

Competition format 
The competition format of the 2019 Championship Tour was changed from previous years. In 2019, all competitors were to compete in a Seeding Round. From this seeding round, the two highest scoring surfers in each heat advance to round of 32, and the lowest placed surfer competes in an elimination round. In the elimination round heats, the top two surfers from each heat progress to the round of 32, while the losing four are eliminated. A single elimination format is then used from the Round of 32, with only the heat winner advancing.

Prize money 
2018 saw 36 Male surfers compete for $607,800 across the tour, while the 18 women on tour were competing for $303,900. In individual events such as the 2018 RipCurl pro, the Male winner Italo Ferreira was awarded $100,000 while the female winner, Stephanie Gilmore, was awarded $65,000. The WSL announced on the 5 September 2018 that female and male surfers, from the 2019 tour onwards, would receive equal prize money.

This was partnered with three initiatives by the WSL to elevate and enhance equality in female surfing, including; increased marketing of the women’s tour, a “local community engagement program for girls around the world” structured around the world tour events, and “a monthly content series” about the history of female surfing. This change has been recognised as a “wider push to challenge gender norms and improve the status of women across sport industries globally”. An article on the topic found that “female surfers will likely be encouraged to pursue surfing as a professional sport, knowing that the financial cost of their attempts to reach the championship tour will be less daunting” as while professional tour surfers are often supported by sponsors and investors, it is the women on the qualifying tour who must fund their own efforts to go professional.

This has further been recognised as part of ongoing cultural change with regards to gender equality and social justice not only in sport but in the global community, with it argued that “the voices and experiences of athletes” form critical part of progressive movement. Kelly Slater stated that “the women on the tour deserve this change. I'm so proud that surfing is choosing to lead sports in equality and fairness. The female WSL athletes are equally committed to their craft as the male athletes and should be paid the same. Surfing has always been a pioneering sport, and this serves as an example of that." Stephanie Gilmore stated “the prize money is fantastic, but the message means even more. From the moment current ownership became involved, the situation for the women surfers has been transformed for the better in every way”, and that she hoped this change would serve “as a model for other sports, global organizations and society as a whole”.

WSL Pure 
WSL Pure is the philanthropic branch of the WSL, focusing on ocean health and sustainability. The WSL Pure campaign made three commitments to be completed by the end of 2019.

Commitment to eliminate single use plastic 
The WSL pledged to remove the usage of single-serve plastics from their events by the end of 2019 in light of their impact on the marine environment. This is due to the breakdown of these single use plastics into microparticles, which bioaccumulate, shown in studies that found 83% of the worlds drinking water is contaminated with microplastic.

Commitment to becoming carbon neutral 
The WSL made the commitment to become carbon neutral by the end of 2019, as the movement of surfers globally to compete and spectate WSL events leaves a substantial carbon footprint. WSL pure pledged to reinvest “the cost of our tour’s carbon footprint into projects that safeguard marine life”.

Commitment to coast environment protection 
The WSL further made the commitment to protecting the environments where they hold events. The WSL stated that from trampling over sand dunes, to sunscreen bleaching reefs, wherever we travel, humans leave their mark and our coastal communities are continually feeling this pressure”. They aim to alleviate and help mitigate this human impact. This includes protecting dunes, ensuring adequate trash removal, the use of reef-safe sunscreen, following local instruction to protect sensitive habitats and donating to local organisations.

See also 
2019 ISA World Surfing Games

References

External links 
 Official Site

 
World Surf League
World League
World Surf League